Gareth Jewell (born 7 June 1983) is a British television actor from Ammanford, Wales.

Career

Before concentrating on his acting career, Jewell held a number of different jobs after getting rejected from RADA as a teenager. In 2009 Jewell portrayed the character of Rob Williams in the BBC Wales drama Crash. This followed with a cameo appearance as a car thief in Welsh language film Patagonia, and a role in the 2010 BBC One drama The Indian Doctor. In 2011 he was cast as Owen, the lead male character in the BBC Wales drama Baker Boys, after attending an audition with co-stars Eve Myles and Matthew Gravelle.

As of 2013, Jewell has been part of the main cast on S4C's school drama Gwaith/Cartref. His storylines have been based on his controversial relationship with Sian Bowen-Harries (Janet Aethwy) and the history of his father's domestic violence.

In 2011 The Western Mail listed him as the 24th sexiest man in Wales.

Filmography

References

External links 
 
 Baker Boys Interview

1983 births
People from Ammanford
British male television actors
Living people